Pioneer Institute is a free-market think tank based in Boston, Massachusetts. The organization was founded in 1988 by Lovett C. Peters. Pioneer's stated mission is "to develop and communicate dynamic ideas that advance prosperity and a vibrant civic life in Massachusetts and beyond."

Activities
Pioneer conducts research in the area of education reform, including charter schools and standards-based education. Pioneer's educational reform work strongly influenced education changes in Massachusetts in the early 1990s. The Institute created a fellowship program to train charter school entrepreneurs, which in 2003 became a separate non-profit organization, the Building Excellent Schools Foundation, which trains charter operators around the nation. The Boston Globe wrote that the Pioneer Institute "has a national profile as the brains of the Common Core opposition." Former Massachusetts Senate President Tom Birmingham, a Democrat, joined the Pioneer Institute in 2015 as Distinguished Senior Fellow in Education.

The Institute also conducts research on healthcare policy, job and business creation, limited and effective state and local government, welfare reform, public pensions, public finance, and government transparency.

See also
 Charlie Baker, former executive director
 List of think tanks

References

External links 
 Pioneer Institute website
 Organizational Profile – National Center for Charitable Statistics (Urban Institute)

Political and economic think tanks in the United States
Think tanks established in 1988
Conservative organizations in the United States